The Miss International Thailand is a beauty pageant that has been held every year since 2015 with winners competing in the Miss International, one of the Big Four major international beauty pageants. Accordingly, Miss International Thailand is not related to the previous franchises of Miss Thailand or Miss Thailand World or Miss Universe Thailand.

History 
In 2000–2014,2017, ERM Marketing Co.,Ltd.,Thailand. (Thaimiss) send a Thai representative to compete at Miss International to present. Rungthip Pinyo, was selected to compete in Miss International 1968, becoming her country's first representative at the Miss International pageant.

In 2015–2016, Thairath Pcl. (Thairath TV) was awarded the rights to host the Miss International Thailand pageant and to send a Thai representative to compete at Miss International. Sasi Sintawee was crowned the first Miss International Thailand in 2015.

In 2018, NOW 26 TV was awarded the rights to host the Miss International Thailand pageant.

Performance at Miss International 
Thailand's most successful entrant came in 1971, when Supuk Likitkul placed 1st Runner-up to Miss International 1971 and in 2010, Piyaporn Deejing, repeated this feat and placed second to Miss International 2010.

In 2015, Sasi Sintawee was crown Miss International Thailand. She was the first girl to get the position. Miss International Thailand The official contest organizer. In Miss International 2015 at Tokyo. She was placed in the Top 10. Sintawee was also the first Miss International Thailand who got a placement at Miss International Pageant.

In Tokyo City where Miss International 2016 was held, Pattiya Pongthai was one of the semi-finalists in the Top 15 round, which made Thailand called-in the semi-finalist two years in a row.

In 2019, Miss Thailand replaced Miss International Thailand to send delegate to Miss International.

Titleholders

Winners by province

Miss International Thailand representatives at International beauty pageants 
Color keys

Miss International

Past Franchises 
Color keys

Miss Tourism Queen International

Miss Global Beauty Queen

Miss All Nations

Miss Asia Pacific International

Miss Super Talent of The World

Miss Heritage

Supermodel International

World Miss University

Miss Multinational

Miss Metropolitan Globe

See also

References

External links
Official site of Miss International
Official site of Miss Thailand for Miss International
Pageantopolis

Miss International Thailand
Miss International by country
Beauty pageants in Thailand